Royal Natal National Park is a  park in KwaZulu-Natal province, South Africa and forms part of the uKhahlamba Drakensberg Park World Heritage Site. Notwithstanding the name, it is actually not a South African National Park managed by the SANParks, but rather a Provincial Park managed by Ezemvelo KZN Wildlife. This park is now included in the Maloti-Drakensberg Transfrontier Conservation Area Peace Park.

The Drakensberg Mountains were once the hunting ground of the San people (bushmen). Though the San no longer live in the area, they recorded their exploits in the form of remarkable rock paintings.

A distinctive rock feature and popular hiking destination in the park is the so-called "Policeman's Helmet".

See also 
 Tugela Falls Bergville
 Ezemvelo KZN Wildlife
 List of conservation areas of South Africa

References

External links 

 
 Royal Natal National Park accommodation
 Royal Natal at KZN Wildlife
 uKhahlamba Drakensberg Park at UNESCO World heritage

Ezemvelo KZN Wildlife Parks
Nature reserves in South Africa
National parks of South Africa
Tugela River